Clement John Tranter,  (16 August 1909 – 27 October 1991) was a British mathematics professor, researcher and the author of several key academic textbooks. Born in 1909 into a family of scientists, he served as a captain in the Second World War, before receiving his doctorate from the University of Oxford and later becoming professor of mathematical physics at the Royal Military College of Science in Shrivenham. His published works became popular in schools during the 1970s and were the standard textbooks used by A-level students for several years; they are still used in Far Eastern schools today.

He was made Commander of the Order of the British Empire and died of a sudden heart attack at his home in Highworth, close to Swindon. He was survived by his wife Joan, who later died on 6 December 2008.

Published works
 Advanced Level Pure Mathematics, 1953.
 Techniques of Mathematical Analysis, 1957.
 Integral Transforms in Mathematical Physics, 1959. (translated to Spanish)
 Differential Equations for Engineers and Scientists, 1961.
 Mathematics For Sixth Form Scientists, 1964.
 Bessel Functions with some Physical Applications, 1969.

References
 L.W. Longdon & D.C. Stocks (1994) "Clement John Tranter", Bulletin of the London Mathematical Society 26(5):497–502.

1909 births
1991 deaths
People educated at Cirencester Grammar School
British non-fiction writers
20th-century British mathematicians
British physicists
People from Highworth
Commanders of the Order of the British Empire
Royal Artillery officers
Alumni of The Queen's College, Oxford
British male writers
20th-century non-fiction writers
Male non-fiction writers
Military personnel from Wiltshire
British Army personnel of World War II